Ain al-Shaara (Arabic: عين الشعره) is a Syrian village in the Qatana District of the Rif Dimashq Governorate. According to the Syria Central Bureau of Statistics (CBS), Ain al-Shaara had a population of 659 in the 2004 census. Part of its inhabitants are Druze.

History
In 1838, Eli Smith noted Ain al-Shaara's population as Druze and Orthodox Christians.

References

Bibliography

 

Druze communities in Syria
Eastern Orthodox Christian communities in Syria
Populated places in Qatana District